Gymnosiphon (yellowseed) is a genus of monocotyledonous flowering plants from the yam order. Like most of the other members of the family in which the plant is placed (Burmanniaceae), Gymnosiphon is entirely myco-heterotrophic genus that does not contain chlorophyll and respectively does not perform photosynthesis.

Gymnosiphon is distributed across the moist, tropical regions of Asia, America and Africa. The plant has very small size and thin stems. Leaves are rudimentary and with appearance like scales or bracts. Its flowers are white in color, pale and solitary or sometimes collected in tiny inflorescences of few depending on the species. They are also actinomorphic with three larger outer tepals and three more inner and smaller ones.

Phylogenetically Gymnosiphon is placed in the clade of Burmanniaceae sensu stricto.

 Species

References

Burmanniaceae
Dioscoreales genera
Parasitic plants